East Clarendon Middle-High School is a combined public school located in the town of Turbeville, South Carolina. It is a branch of the Clarendon County School District Four.

History

Before 1948, there were three schools located on the eastern side of Clarendon County: Gable High School (Gable, South Carolina), Salem High School (New Zion, South Carolina), & Turbeville High School (Turbeville, South Carolina). In 1949, Gable and Salem were consolidated to create Black River High School. Then in 1952, Black River and Turbeville were consolidated to create what is known today as East Clarendon High School. The school made its inaugural start in September of that year.

In the summer of 1970, the South Carolina Department of Education declared mandatory action for the school to integrate with Walker-Gamble High School, then an all-black high school located in New Zion, South Carolina, following the Brown v. Board of Education ruling.

Sports

The school offers the following sports: Baseball, Basketball, Football, Golf, Softball, Tennis, and Volleyball.

Notable alumni
Nathaniel Rowland (Class of 2012), murderer of Samantha Josephson

References

Schools in Clarendon County, South Carolina
Public high schools in South Carolina
Public middle schools in South Carolina
Educational institutions established in 1952
1952 establishments in South Carolina